The IBM 101 Electronic Statistical Machine, introduced in 1952, combines in one unit the functions of sorting, counting, accumulating, balancing, editing, and printing of summaries of facts recorded in IBM cards.

The 101 could sort cards based on multiple columns. For example, if a card had multiple 3-column test scores, the 101 could be wired to sort into pocket 0 those cards with no scores over 090, into pocket 1 those with one score over 090, and so on; logic limited only by the number of relays available.

A. Ross Eckler suggests the development of the 101, with functions similar to earlier multicolumn sorters and unit counters developed by the Census Bureau, "was apparently a direct result of the transfer to IBM of Lawrence Wilson, who had served as chief of the Census Bureau's Machine Tabulation Division".

Functions
The following operations may be performed at the rate of 450 cards per minute:
 Sort IBM cards into numeric or alphabetic sequence
 Arrange cards into a desired pattern
 Check cards for consistency of coded information
 Check the accuracy of sorting
 Search cards for specific facts or combinations of facts
 Count cards for as many as 60 different classifications
 Print reports in final form on one or two printers
 Print group identification
 Print a check symbol on each line of a report to indicate that totals printed on that line cross-check
 Summary punch totals when one or two summary punches are connected to the 101.

The operation of the 101 is directed by the use of a removable control panel.

Related Equipment
IBM Devices often used in conjunction with an IBM 101 included:

Capabilities table

IBM 524
The IBM 524 is a Duplicating Summary Punch, and two of them can be attached to an IBM 101.

Other units
 IBM 514 (Reproducing Punch)
 IBM 519 Document-Originating Machine
 IBM 521 Punch Unit
 IBM 523 Gang Summary Punch
 IBM 526 Printing Summary Punch
 IBM 528 Accumulating Reproducer
 IBM 529 Punch Unit
 IBM 541 Card Read Punch
 IBM 542 Card Read Punch
 IBM 549 Ticket Converter

Gangpunch
The term gangpunch refers to duplicating the content of a punched card onto one or more of those that follow - to copy information from a master card into the following detail cards.

References

External links
 

101